Looking Into It is the third album by All Girl Summer Fun Band, released in 2008, and the first to be self-released on the AGSFB Music label.

Track listing
All songs written by Kim Baxter, Kathy Foster, and Jen Sbragia.
 "Not the One for Me" - 3:14
 "Something New" - 3:48
 "Oh No" - 3:03
 "Trajectory" - 3:17
 "Lost" - 3:23
 "Everything I Need" - 3:33
 "The Only Ones" - 3:47
 "Rewind" - 2:19
 "Looking into It" - 2:18
 "Plastic Toy Dream" - 3:38
 "This Will Never End" - 3:43

References

2008 albums
All Girl Summer Fun Band albums